Huland is a village in Belgaum district in the southern state of Karnataka, [ndia.

References

Villages in Belagavi district